Ghana Association of Bankers is the umbrella body that governs and provides advocacy for Ghanaian bankers.

References

Banking in Ghana
Bankers associations